Arnold Lundgren (5 January 1899 – 21 June 1979) was a Danish cyclist. He competed in two events at the 1920 Summer Olympics.

References

External links
 

1899 births
1979 deaths
Danish male cyclists
Olympic cyclists of Denmark
Cyclists at the 1920 Summer Olympics
Cyclists from Copenhagen